Mordellistena serratipes is a species of beetle in the genus Mordellistena of the family Mordellidae. It was described by Lea in 1931.

References

External links
Coleoptera. BugGuide.

Beetles described in 1931
serratipes